Philip Scott Yorke (1905–1978) was the last Squire of Erddig.

Early life and education
Philip was born on 23 March 1905, at Erddig, Denbighshire.  He was the second son of Philip Yorke II and Louisa Matilda (née Scott), and the final direct descendant of Philip Yorke; Simon Yorke was his elder brother.  In 1927 he graduated from Corpus Christi College, Cambridge with a B.A., and attended Ridley Hall to take Holy Orders but left without graduating.

Life at Erddig

Yorke was a lay reader for local churches, Erddig's income had been low since the time of their father,  In 1973,  Philip gave Erddig Estate, including the house, to the National Trust; a gift worth around 3 million pounds.

Death and legacy
Philip Scott Yorke died on 2 July 1978, at Pen-y-lan Church after cycling there on a hot morning. More than 15,000 documents from his house were presented to Clwyd Record Office.

References 

Welsh landowners
Welsh actors
Alumni of Corpus Christi College, Cambridge
1905 births
1978 deaths
Anglican lay readers
Welsh Anglicans